Rainer Packalén (21 February 1917 – 8 September 2008) was a Finnish sailor. He competed in the Dragon event at the 1948 Summer Olympics.

References

External links
 

1917 births
2008 deaths
Finnish male sailors (sport)
Olympic sailors of Finland
Sailors at the 1948 Summer Olympics – Dragon
Sportspeople from Helsinki